Two ships have been named Arktika, Russian for the Arctic:

 , the lead ship of Russian Arktika-class icebreakers, launched in 1972 and entered service in 1975. She was retired in October 2008.
 , the lead ship of Russian Project 22220 icebreakers, launched in 2016 and entered service in 2020

Ship names